"Organized by death toll" means
 list entries are ordered by death toll, or 
 there is a table sortable on a column labeled "Death toll", "Casualties", or equivalent

General 
 List of accidents and disasters by death toll
 List of wars and anthropogenic disasters by death toll
 List of famines, not included in natural disasters as some of them are at least partially anthropogenic

Accidents 
 List of aircraft accidents and incidents by number of ground fatalities
 List of deadliest aircraft accidents and incidents
 List of airship accidents
 List of ballooning accidents
 List of elevator accidents
 List of nuclear and radiation accidents by death toll
 List of rail accidents in the United Kingdom
 List of the deadliest firefighter disasters in the United States

Natural disasters including diseases 
 List of costly or deadly hailstorms
 List of the deadliest tropical cyclones
 List of deadliest Pacific hurricanes
 List of epidemics
 List of tornadoes causing 100 or more deaths
 List of deadliest Storm Prediction Center days by outlook risk level
 List of natural disasters by death toll
 List of avalanches by death toll
 List of deadliest floods
 List of foodborne illness outbreaks by death toll
 List of volcanic eruptions by death toll

Intentional killing, including collateral deaths 
 American units with the highest percentage of casualties per conflict
 Deadliest single days of World War I
 List of battles and other violent events by death toll
 List of battles by casualties
 List of battles with most United States military fatalities
 List of genocides by death toll
 List of major terrorist incidents
 List of modern conflicts in the Middle East
 List of murderers by number of victims
 List of ongoing armed conflicts
 List of projected death tolls from nuclear attacks on cities
 List of rampage killers
 List of serial killers before 1900
 List of serial killers by number of victims
 List of ships sunk by submarines by death toll
 List of terrorist incidents
 List of wars by death toll

Massacres 

 List of events named massacres
 List of pogroms
 List of massacres at sea
 List of massacres in the Italian Social Republic
 List of massacres in Jerusalem
 List of massacres in Nagaland
 List of massacres of Kurds
 List of massacres of Nizari Ismailis
 List of massacres of Turkish people

By war 
 List of massacres during the Algerian Civil War
 List of massacres in the Bosnian War
 List of massacres in the Croatian War of Independence
 List of massacres committed during the Eritrean War of Independence
 List of massacres in the Finnish Civil War
 List of massacres in the Kosovo War
 List of killings and massacres during the 1948 Palestine war
 List of massacres during the Syrian civil war
 List of mass executions and massacres in Yugoslavia during World War II

School-related shootings and attacks 
 List of attacks related to post-secondary schools
 List of attacks related to primary schools, includes kindergarten attacks
 List of attacks related to secondary schools
 List of school massacres by death toll
 List of school shootings in the United States (before 2000)
 List of school shootings in the United States (2000–present)
 List of school shootings in the United States by death toll

Disasters by place 
 List of disasters in Antarctica by death toll
 List of disasters in Metro Manila by death toll
 List of disasters in New York City by death toll

Country 
 List of disasters in Australia by death toll
 List of disasters in Bangladesh by death toll
 List of disasters in Canada by death toll
 List of disasters in Croatia by death toll
 List of disasters in Estonia by death toll
 List of disasters in Great Britain and Ireland by death toll
 List of disasters in Japan by death toll
 List of disasters in Malta by death toll
 List of disasters in New Zealand by death toll
 List of disasters in Poland by death toll
 List of disasters in Romania by death toll
 List of disasters in Sweden by death toll
 List of disasters in the United States by death toll